Phil Robert "Bob" Drake (December 14, 1919 – April 18, 1990) was an American racecar driver. He participated in one Formula One Grand Prix, on November 20, 1960. He scored no championship points. Drake was the last driver to race the famous Maserati 250F in a Formula One World Championship Grand Prix, the 1960 United States Grand Prix. The 250F was a 2.5 litre front-engined Grand Prix car that was considered obsolete in 1961 due to new engine rules.

Aside from being a race car driver, he was a naval diver, restaurateur, and stunt performer.

Complete Formula One World Championship results
(key)

References 

1919 births
1990 deaths
American Formula One drivers
Racing drivers from San Francisco